Anthony Gonzalez (born September 23, 2004) is an American actor. He has appeared in the TV series The Bridge (2014) and Criminal Minds: Beyond Borders (2017), and provided the voice of Miguel, the main character in the Pixar film Coco (2017).

Career
Gonzalez voiced the lead character Miguel Rivera in the 2017 Pixar film Coco. Gonzalez won an Annie Award, Washington D.C. Area Film Critics Association, and Teen Choice Award for his role.

Filmography

Awards

References

External links
 
 

2004 births
Living people
21st-century American male actors
American male child actors
American male film actors
American male television actors
American male voice actors
Annie Award winners
American people of Guatemalan descent